The women's 200 metres at the 2014 European Athletics Championships took place at the Letzigrund on 14 and 15 August.

Medalists

Records

Schedule

Results

Round 1
First 4 in each heat (Q) and 4 best performers (q) advance to the Semifinals.

Wind:Heat 1: +0.1 m/s, Heat 2: +0.1 m/s, Heat 3: +0.1 m/s, Heat 4: −0.4 m/s, Heat 5: +0.1 m/s

Semifinals
First 2 in each heat (Q) and 2 best performers (q) advance to the Final.

Wind:Heat 1: +0.3 m/s, Heat 2: −0.6 m/s, Heat 3: +0.3 m/s

Final
Wind: −0.5 m/s

References

200 W
200 metres at the European Athletics Championships
2014 in women's athletics